Nikolay Petrovich Dubinin (January 4, 1907 – March 26, 1998) was a Soviet and Russian biologist and academician.

He worked under the supervision of Sergei Chetverikov.

He was a Corresponding Member of the Division of Biological Sciences from 1946 and Academician of the Division of the General Biology from 1966.

He was a founding member of the Institute of Cytology and Genetics (IC&G) in the Russian Academy of Sciences. During the two years of his directorship (1957–1959) Dubinin worked out research goals at the IC&G and assembled its early staff.

In 1982, Dubinin and Dmitry Belyayev  studied the genetic basis of human individuality in different populations. In 1983, they worked with V. I. Trubnikov studying the variability and heritability of neuro- and psychodynamic parameters. In 2002 the "Genetic Consequences of Emergency Radiation Situations" conference was dedicated to him.

1907 births
1998 deaths
Scientists from Vladivostok
Soviet biologists
Full Members of the USSR Academy of Sciences
Full Members of the Russian Academy of Sciences
Foreign associates of the National Academy of Sciences
Heroes of Socialist Labour
Lenin Prize winners
Recipients of the Order of Lenin
Burials in Troyekurovskoye Cemetery
Soviet geneticists
Foreign members of the Serbian Academy of Sciences and Arts